Cavedine (Cavéden or Cavédem in local dialect) is a comune (municipality) in Trentino in the northern Italian region Trentino-Alto Adige/Südtirol, located about  southwest of Trento.

The municipality of Cavedine contains the frazioni (subdivisions, mainly villages and hamlets) Brusino, Cavedine, Stravino, Vigo Cavedine and Lago di Cavedine.

Cavedine borders the following municipalities: Trento, Lasino, Dro, Cimone, Villa Lagarina and Drena.

Demographic evolution

References

External links
 Homepage of the city

Cities and towns in Trentino-Alto Adige/Südtirol